Luchsinger or Lucksinger is a surname. The name is believed to stem from the village of Luchsingen in the Swiss canton of Glarus.

Notable people with the surname include:

Felix Luchsinger, Swiss curler
Fritz Luchsinger (1921–1983), Swiss mountaineer
Fritz Luchsinger, Swiss curler
John Luchsinger, American legislator and pioneer
Richard Luchsinger (1900–1993), Swiss doctor
Susie Luchsinger, American singer
Tom Luchsinger, American swimmer

References